Rhododendron spinuliferum is a species of flowering plant in the family Ericaceae, native to Yunnan and Sichuan, China.

Description

The red tube-shaped flowers appear from February to June. These tubular corollas and tapered ends are unusual for the genus.

Taxonomy
French botanist Adrien René Franchet described Rhododendron spinuliferum in 1895. Two subspecies are recognised. Within the genus Rhododendron, it lies in the subgenus Rhododendron and section Rhododendron. Analysis of its DNA shows it is most closely related to R. triflorum, the two sister species having R. keiskei as the next closest relative. However, the section appears to be polyphyletic, with these species early offshoots of the section Vireya.

Distribution and habitat

Cultivation and uses
In cultivation, Rhododendron spinuliferum grows best in acidic soils of pH 4–6 with a shady aspect and significant organic material in the soil, although excess shade will result in few flowers and leggy habit. Readily propagated by seed or cuttings, it flowers in four to five years from seed.

Hybrid cultivars derived from this species include:
 Rhododendron 'Crossbill' (spinuliferum × lutescens) 
 Rhododendron 'Seta' A.M. (spinuliferum × moupinense) 
 Rhododendron 'Spinulosum'

Chinese traditional medicine
Rhododendron spinuliferum has been used in Chinese traditional medicine to remove phlegm and treat asthma.

References

spinuliferum
Endemic flora of China
Flora of Sichuan
Flora of Yunnan
Plants used in traditional Chinese medicine
Plants described in 1895
Taxa named by Adrien René Franchet